Lopé is the southwestern department of Ogooué-Ivindo Province and is in the center of Gabon. The capital lies at Booué.  This is the department with the most land in the Southern Hemisphere. It had a population of 12,382 in 2013.

Towns and villages

References

Ogooué-Ivindo Province
Departments of Gabon